Eternal Youth is the first compilation album by the British mathcore band Rolo Tomassi. The first of these two CDs showcases their material from split extended plays and EPs, while the second disc is composed of early demos, remixes and acoustic tracks. The album was released on Destination Moon records, Rolo Tomassi's own record label. A triple vinyl version of the album was released on 16 April 2011 for Record Store Day through Holy Roar Records. The vinyl pressing was limited to 1,000 copies; 600 on black 200 on tri-colour (transparent clear/yellow/green) and 200 on grey/green.

In promotion the band made the track "Fuck The Pleasantries, Let’s Rock" free to download and stream.

Track listing
Disc One

Disc Two

Personnel
Rolo Tomassi
Edward Dutton - drum kit
Joe Nicholson - electric guitar
Eva Spence - lead vocals
James Spence - synthesizers and co-lead vocals
Joseph Thorpe - electric bass guitar

References

2011 compilation albums
Rolo Tomassi albums